Mirador de Ézaro is a steep mountain road in Galicia, near Costa da Morte, in northern Spain. This road starts in the town of Ézaro (part of Dumbría municipality) by the river Xallas, and it reaches the summit by the homonymous viewpoint. The viewpoint has a magnificent vista of the mouth of the river Xallas, the slopes of granitic Mount Pindo, the cove of O Ézaro, the small Lobeiras islands and the unmistakeable shape of Cape Fisterra in the background.

It is considered a short but very demanding climb in professional road bicycle racing and is often used in the Vuelta a España stage race and UCI Gran Fondo World Series.

Details of the climb
The first  are an average of 14.7%. The second kilometre maintains  14.5%. There are two later ramps at 16% to 18.

First rider passing Mirador de Ézaro in Vuelta a España

See also
 List of mountain passes

References

External links
Climbbybike.com Information on and profile of the Mirador de Ezaro.
Altimetry of the climb.
Gran Fondo Ézaro become a UCI Gran Fondo World Series.

Climbs in cycle racing in Spain
Scenic viewpoints in Spain